Warszawa Rembertów railway station is a railway station in the Rembertów district of Warsaw, Poland. As of 2011, it is served by Koleje Mazowieckie, who run the KM2 and KM6 services from Warszawa Zachodnia to Łuków and Małkinia respectively and by Szybka Kolej Miejska, who run the S2 services from Warszawa Zachodnia to Sulejówek Miłosna.

References
Station article at kolej.one.pl

External links 
 

Railway stations in Poland opened in 1866
Rembertow
Railway stations served by Koleje Mazowieckie
Railway stations served by Szybka Kolej Miejska (Warsaw)
Rembertów
1866 establishments in the Russian Empire